Mike Love is an American singer/songwriter who co-founded the Beach Boys.

Michael Love may also refer to:

Michael Love (footballer) (born 1973), English footballer
Michael James Love, screenwriter, filmmaker
Mike Love (American football) (born 1994), American football defensive end 
Mike Love (reggae musician), Hawaiian reggae musician